Helder Francisco Malauene is a Mozambican politician. He is a member of the Economic, Social and Cultural Council of the African Union and is also Chairman of the Social Affairs and Health Committee.

References

Economic, Social and Cultural Council Standing Committee members
Mozambican politicians
Living people
Mozambican diplomats
Year of birth missing (living people)
Place of birth missing (living people)